Oscar Tritsch was a Romanian footballer who played as a striker. His brother, Leopold Tritsch was also a footballer, they played together at Brașovia Brașov and Romania's national team.

International career
Oscar Tritsch played one friendly match for Romania, playing alongside his brother, Leopold on 26 October 1923 under coach Constantin Rădulescu in a 2–2 against Turkey.

References

External links
 

Year of birth missing
Year of death missing
Romanian footballers
Romania international footballers
Place of birth missing
Association football forwards
Liga I players